Hong Choi is a former South Korean footballer most notable for being the first South Korean footballer to play in Paraguay, when he joined Club Guaraní in 1986.

References

South Korean footballers
South Korean expatriate footballers
Club Guaraní players
Expatriate footballers in Paraguay
Association footballers not categorized by position